Siosateki Havea Mata'u (born 12 May 1979 in Nomuka) is a Tongan rugby union prop. He is a member of the Tonga national rugby union team and participated with the squad at the 2007 Rugby World Cup.

References

1979 births
Living people
Rugby union props
Tongan rugby union players
People from Haʻapai